Lake Street is an east–west street in Chicago and part of its suburbs. A portion of Lake Street is designated as U.S. Route 20. Lake Street begins in downtown Chicago and travels west to the eastern terminus of the Elgin Bypass around suburban Elgin. The street travels west through the city and then begins to travel in a northwest fashion through several suburbs.

Route description 

Lake street begins at the end on the Elgin Bypass and intersection of Shales Pkwy and Bluff City Blvd. US 20 comes from the Elgin bypass onto Lake St. It then crosses the Canadian National Railway and has a traffic light with a suburban road. It then gradually climbs a hill and has another traffic light with car dealerships on the left side when facing east. It then passes by some residential areas and has an interchange with Illinois Route 59 (IL 59). After passing thorugh more residential areas and some warehouses, it crosses under the Metra's Milwaukee District West Line (Canadian Pacific Railway) and meets the current western end of Illinois Route 390 (IL 390). After passing though more residential areas and shops, it enters Bloomingdale. Passing by shops ad gas stations, along with going through a forest, and passing by warehouses, it meets I-355.

Continuing east, Lake Street passes by shopping centers along with more residential areas while paralleling the Eisenhower expressway. Lake street has a lot of traffic lights while in Addison. and crosses over the Salt Creek and Illinois Route 83 (IL 83). Since a portion of Lake Street in Elmhurst has been replaced by the Eisenhower Expressway, US 20 runs on the Eisenhower for 0.97 mi (1.56 km), Lake St. continues on across from the interstate and US 20 continues on with I-290 and finds an exit to Lake st. It ends again before being continued on another ramp leading to its continuation in Stone Park.

In Stone Park, Lake Street runs concurrent with US 20 and passes by more shopping centers. At Mannheim Road, Eastbound U.S. 20 turns south with U.S. Routes 12 and 45. It continues east of Mannheim Road after US 20 leaves. It then crosses over the Union Pacific Railroad and it passes by more residential areas and has an intersection with Illinois Route 171 (IL 171). It turns east and parallels the Union Pacific Railroad, and passes through Maywood and River Forest before it intersects Illinois Route 43 in Oak Park, (IL 43) and Illinois Route 50 (IL 50).

In South Austin, it ends crosses under the Union Pacific and continues southeast with the CTA Green Line tracks in the middle. It passes through Garfield Park and continues east toward downtown Chicago. It crosses railroad tracks and the CTA tracks then elevate as they are part of the Chicago "L" system. It intersects major streets in Chicago and has a partial interchange with the Kennedy Expressway and Interstates 90 and 94. It then continues east and ends at Stetson Avenue.

History 

Most of Lake Street was once marked as U.S. 20. In 1938, U.S. 20 was moved onto Mannheim Road and La Grange Road. The remaining segment of Lake Street became City U.S. 20. In 1960, it was renamed to Business U.S. 20. In 1968, all designations were dropped from Lake Street east of Mannheim Road.

Major intersections

References 

Streets in Chicago
U.S. Route 20
Transportation in Cook County, Illinois
Transportation in DuPage County, Illinois